Lovejoy is an extinct town in Cape Girardeau County, in the U.S. state of Missouri. The GNIS classifies it as a populated place.

A post office called Lovejoy was established in 1887, and remained in operation until 1894. The community took its name from nearby Lovejoy Creek.

References

Ghost towns in Missouri
Former populated places in Cape Girardeau County, Missouri